Øyfjell is a village in Vinje Municipality in Vestfold og Telemark county, Norway.

As many other rural villages in Norway, Øyfjell has witnessed a decline in population. Currently the village is trying to reverse the development with a project which aims to draw people and businesses to the village.

Name
The name of the village might be derived from Ødefjeld (which translates to "desolate mountain"). The origin of the name is connected to the impact left on the village by the Black Death when the residents of the area all died out, leaving the area desolated for a time.

External links
 Official site

References

Vinje
Villages in Vestfold og Telemark